The George Jones Story is a double album by George Jones.  It was released on the Musicor label in 1968.

The album is a mixed bag of new recordings, covers of recent hits, and re-recordings of some early hits by Jones, including the Starday cuts "Seasons of My Heart" and "Color of the Blues".  The album also features "I Threw Away the Rose" and "Swinging Doors", both written and made famous by Merle Haggard, who was becoming one of country music's biggest stars at the time.

Track listing
"Am I That Easy To Forget" (Carl Belew, W.S. Stevenson)
"I Threw Away The Rose" (Merle Haggard)
"Back In Baby's Arms Again" (Dallas Frazier, A.L. Owens)
"Run 'Em Off" (Tony Lee, Onie Wheeler)
"The Man That You Once Knew" (Dallas Frazier)
"Seasons of My Heart" (George Jones, Darrell Edwards)
"Lonely Street" (Carl Belew, W.S. Stevenson, Kenny Snowder)
"Ruby Don't Take Your Guns to Town" (Mel Tillis)
"Soldier's Last Letter" (Ernest Tubb, Redd Stewart)
"Nothin' Shakin' (But the Leaves on the Trees") (Colacrai, Fontaine, Lampert)
"Green, Green Grass of Home" (Curly Putman)
"That Heart Belongs To Me" (Webb Pierce)
"I'll Sail My Ship" (Bernard, Burns, Mann, Thurston)
"Please Don't Let That Woman Get Me" (Dallas Frazier)
"Worst of Luck" (Leon Payne)
"Color of the Blues" (Jones, Lawton Williams)
"Even the Bad Times Are Good" (Carl Belew)
"The Shoe Goes On The Other Foot Tonight" (Billy Mize)
"Swinging Doors" (Merle Haggard)
"Your Steppin' Stone" (Bozo Darnell, Major Lupel)

1968 albums
George Jones albums
Musicor Records albums